The Ashton Avenue Bridge is a pedestrian, cycling and busway bridge in Bristol, England. Grade II listed, it was constructed as a road-rail bridge as part of the Bristol Harbour Railway. It now carries a Bristol MetroBus guided busway route and National Cycle Network cycle routes.

Background
The Great Western Railway (GWR) was a business proposal by Isambard Kingdom Brunel to shorten the travel time between London and the new world of North America, accessed via New York City. Able to gain finance from the City of Bristol, the first Act of Parliament allowed for the construction of the GWR from London to Bristol via Reading, Swindon and Bath, Somerset.

The original Bristol Harbour Railway (BHR) was a joint venture by the GWR and sister company the Bristol and Exeter Railway. Its route included a tunnel under St Mary Redcliffe church, and a steam-powered bascule bridge over the entrance locks at Bathurst Basin.

Construction
This connection would allow a doubling of BHR rail access capacity to the Great Western Main Line.

In 1905, it was proposed to undertake the authorised extension of the BHR from Wapping Wharf across Spike Island. It would then junction into two branches: a western branch to Wapping via a line alongside the New Cut; and to Canons Marsh on the northside of the River Avon, which would then merge with the Portishead Railway (Butterfly Junction).

Under a joint agreement, Bristol Corporation and the GWR engaged as their Chief Engineer J.C. lnglis. The building contractor was John Lysaght and Co., while Armstrong Whitworth were engaged to design the hydraulic movement system. Construction of the  span-bridge started in 1905, with two squared rock-faced limestone piers, the southern one of which would pivot the swinging span. With the bridge able to operate both ways, each opening/closing cycle consumed  of water from the Floating Harbour. The bridge control cabin, road and railway signal boxes, and the reversible hydraulic motor were all housed in a single structure perched on stilts above the upper road deck.

The original estimate for the bridge was £36,500, with the GWR agreeing to pay half. The final cost was £70,389, to which Bristol Corporation asked the GWR to increase its contribution. After further negotiation the GWR contributed £22,000.

Operations
Designed and opened as the freight-only Wapping Wharf Branch, the bridge was opened on 3 October 1906 by the Lady Mayoress, Mrs A.J.Smith. With both railway and road operations and bridge maintenance undertaken by the GWR, it opened on average ten times a day until February 1934. The controlling railway signals were interlocked with the signal boxes on either side of the river, making it impossible for signals to be cleared unless the bridge span was locked in the closed position.

Decommissioning

Bristol Corporation rescinded the GWR's obligation to maintain the swing apparatus in 1951, after which it was welded shut. After the completion of a new A370 road dual carriageway system in the docks area, and the opening of the replacement Plimsoll Bridge to the west in 1965, the road deck and signal cabin were removed.

The BHR's connection with Temple Meads was closed and the track lifted in 1964, and the Canons Marsh branch closed the following year. The Western Fuel Company continued to use the line from the Portishead branch over the swing bridge and Wapping marshalling yard for commercial coal traffic. The rail line over the bridge was singled in 1976, and shut operationally after Western Fuel ceased railway operations in 1987. The bridge was revisited by GWR Pannier Tank No.1369 in 1996, prior to the re-opening of the residual BHR as a visitor attraction.

Present

The bridge was Grade II listed in May 2000, and was listed on the Heritage at Risk Register in 2009. The single track rail line remained in place over the bridge, but was highly overgrown, while the other side of the railway level was converted into a rail trail foot and cycle path, part of the Ashton to Pill Path section of National Cycle Network route 41 and, since 2013, also the "Festival Way" section of National Cycle Network route 33 to Nailsea. 

In 2015 it was announced that the bridge would close for a period of 12 months from the autumn for a complete renovation in connection with the MetroBus project. The bridge now carries a separate single bus lane and a wider cycle and pedestrian path.

See also
Bristol Harbour Railway
List of road-rail bridges

References

External links

Ashton Avenue Bridge @ Forgotten Relic
Ashton Avenue Bridge @ Transport Heritage
Ashton Avenue Bridge @ Bristol Railway Archive

Bristol Harbourside
Bridges completed in 1906
Bridges in Bristol
Road-rail bridges
Armstrong Whitworth
Grade II listed bridges
Grade II listed buildings in Bristol
Structures on the Heritage at Risk register
Bridges across the River Avon, Bristol
1906 establishments in England